Red Motion (stylized in all caps) is the fourth single album of South Korean girl group AOA. It was released on October 14, 2013 by FNC Entertainment. "Confused" was used as the single album's lead song. The single marked AOA's first release as a seven member group following Youkyung becoming exclusive to band lineups.

Release 
After the summer release of "Moya" from the band's sub-unit AOA Black, AOA teased new music for an autumn release by showing fans concept images from the albums photoshoot. These images showed the girls outfitted in matching white lace dresses in bright white rooms creating an angelic look. A video concept teaser was later released through YouTube on October 3, 2013 and showed the girls in the white lace blind folds from the images. A second teaser released on October 7, 2013 showed scenes from the upcoming music video for "Confused". The clip showed all the girls dancing to the chorus of the song, showing off the groups pin-sharp movements.

AOA released their follow-up Red Motion, featuring the sultry dance title song "Confused". The release also featured a second song, "We Belong Together". Both songs were co-written by the leader of the group, Jimin.

Promotion 
On October 10, 2013 AOA appeared for their comeback stage on M Countdown promoting their song "Confused". The girls also showcased the songs through several other programs including Inkigayo, Show Champion, Show! Music Core, MTV's The Show and Music Bank.

Track list 
The CD single's tracks are as follows:

Charts and sales

Weekly charts

Sales

References

AOA (group) songs
2013 singles
Korean-language songs
2013 songs
Dance-pop songs
FNC Entertainment singles